The women's 200 metres event at the 2003 Summer Universiade was held in Daegu, South Korea on 27–28 August.

Medalists

Results

Heats
Wind:Heat 1: +0.8 m/s, Heat 2: 0.0 m/s, Heat 3: -1.1 m/s, Heat 4: -1.9 m/s, Heat 5: -1.2 m/s

Quarterfinals
Wind:Heat 1: -1.6 m/s, Heat 2: -2.1 m/s, Heat 3: -0.5 m/s

Semifinals
Wind:Heat 1: +0.1 m/s, Heat 2: +0.4 m/s

Final
Wind: +1.4 m/s

References
Results

Athletics at the 2003 Summer Universiade
2003 in women's athletics
2003